{{Infobox cricket team
| name         = Gujarat lions
|alt_name      = 
| image           = Gujarat Lions.png
| alt             =
| nickname        =
| captain         = Suresh Raina
| coach           = Brad Hodge
| city            = Rajkot, Gujarat, India
| owner           = Keshav Bansal (Intex Technologies)
| founded         = 
| dissolved       =  May 2017
| ground          = Saurashtra Cricket Association Stadium, Rajkot
| ground2         = Green Park Stadium, Kanpur
| t_pattern_la          = 
| t_pattern_b           = _bluerightsideshoulder
| t_pattern_ra          = 
| t_pattern_pants       = 
| t_leftarm             = FF4500
| t_body                = FF4500
| t_rightarm            = FF4500
| t_pants               = 0500F8
}}Gujarat Lions' was a franchise cricket team based in the city of Rajkot, that represented the Indian state Gujarat in the Indian Premier League (IPL). The team played in the IPL The team, along with Rising Pune Supergiant for two season between 2016 and 2017 as one of the replacements for Chennai Super Kings and Rajasthan Royals, who were both suspended for two seasons due to illegal betting by their respective owners. The franchise was owned by Intex Technologies.

History
 2016 

The team played five of their home matches at Saurashtra Cricket Association Stadium, Rajkot and two of their home matches at Green Park Stadium, Kanpur in the IPL 2016. In IPL 2016, the team won 9 matches, and topped the points table.

 2017 

In 2017, the team won four matches out of fourteen, and did not qualify for the playoffs.

The team did not receive an extension to play in further seasons of the tournament, and has been defunct since 2017. In 2022, another Gujarati team, the Gujarat Titans, entered the IPL.

 Team identity 
The team logo featured a lion. The team song is called "Game mari che''" (The Game is ours, in Gujarati).

Sponsors and partners

References 

Indian Premier League teams
Sports clubs in India
Cricket clubs established in 2016
Cricket in Gujarat
2016 establishments in Gujarat